Edificio Victory Garden is a four-story apartment house that faces on Ponce de Leon Avenue and Elisa Colberg Street in the Miramar district of Santurce, Puerto Rico. It was deemed notable as "one of Puerto Rico's finest examples of Spanish Revival apartment houses from the early 20th century."

The building was designed by Pedro Adolfo de Castro y Besosa (January 5, 1895-October, 1936), the first United States university-trained Puerto Rican architect.  He designed 33 or more apartment houses during 1929–1936.  Rafael Carmoega emerged to higher prominence only after de Castro's early death, at age 41.

Although it appears massive, the building's footprint only uses up 30 percent of the lot's area.  It is U-shaped with a courtyard not visible from the corner of the streets.

References

Mission Revival architecture in Puerto Rico
Spanish Revival architecture in Puerto Rico
National Register of Historic Places in San Juan, Puerto Rico
Residential buildings completed in 1936
Santurce, San Juan, Puerto Rico
Apartment buildings on the National Register of Historic Places
Residential buildings on the National Register of Historic Places in Puerto Rico
1936 establishments in Puerto Rico